Below is the List of French Army regiments (1776).  Also included are the changes from the supplemental 1778 ordnance.  Flags next to each unit represents what the majority of its members come from.

Cavalry 
In 1776 the Royal French Army consisted of five 'groups' of cavalry ranging from light to heavy cavalry: Cavalerie (equivalent of Heavy Line Cavalry), Hussars, Chasseurs à Cheval, Chevaulégers, and Dragons (Dragoons).

Line Cavalry 

 Régiment de Commissaire Général Cavalerie
 Régiment Royal Étranger Cavalerie
 Régiment de Cuirassiers du Roi
 Régiment Royal Cravate Cavalerie
  Régiment Royal Piémont Cavalerie
  Régiment Royal Allemand Cavalerie
  Régiment Royal Pologne Cavalerie
 Régiment Royal Lorraine Cavalerie
 Régiment Royal Champagne Cavalerie
  Régiment Royal Navarre Cavalry
 Régiment Royal Normandie Cavalerie
Régiment du Dauphin Cavalerie
 Régiment de Bourgogne Cavalerie
 Régiment de Berry Cavalerie
  Régiment Nassau-Saarbrück Cavalerie (formed in 1778, from County of Nassau-Saarbrücken)

Hussars 

 Régiment de Colonel Général Hussards
 Régiment de Bercheny Hussards
 Régiment de Chamborant Hussards
 Régiment de Esterhazy Hussards
  Régiment de Conflans Hussards

Dragoons 

 Régiment de Colonel Général Dragons
 Régiment de Mestre de Camp Général Dragons
 Régiment Royal Dragons
 Régiment du Roi Dragons
 Régiment de La Reine Dragons
 Régiment du Dauphin Dragons
 Régiment de Monsieur Dragons
 Régiment de Artois Dragons
 Régiment d'Orléans Dragons
 Régiment de Chartres (transferred from the Line Cavalry)
 Régiment de Condé Dragons
 Régiment de Bourbon Dragons
 Régiment de Conti Dragons (transferred from the Line Cavalry)
 Régiment de Penthièvre Dragons
 Régiment de Boufflers Dragons
 Régiment de Custine Dragons
 Régiment de La Rochefoucauld Dragons
 Régiment de Chabot Dragons
 Régiment de Lanan Dragons
 Régiment de Belzunce Dragons
 Régiment de Languedoc Dragons
 Régiment de Noailles Dragons
  Régiment de Schomberg Dragons

Infantry 
In 1776 the Royal French Army consisted of six 'groups' of infantry ranging from infantry to Guards:  Guards, French Infantry, Chasseurs, Infantry of the Colonies, and the Foreign Regiments.

Guards 

 Gardes Françaises (6 Battalions)
  Gardes Suisses (4 Battalions)

French Infantry 

 Régiment de Colonel Général
 Régiment de Picardie
  Régiment de Piémont
 Régiment de Provence (formed in 1776)
  Régiment de Navarre
 Régiment d'Armagnac (formed in 1776)
 Régiment de Champagne
 Régiment de Ponthieu (formed in 1776)
 Régiment de Normandie
 Régiment de Neustrie (formed in 1776)
 Régiment de La Marine
 Régiment d'Auxerrois (formed in 1776)
 Régiment de Bourbonnais
 Régiment de Forez (formed in 1776)
 Régiment de Béarn
 Régiment d'Agénois (formed in 1776)
 Régiment d'Auvergne
 Régiment de Gâtinais (formed in 1776)
  Régiment de Flandre
 Régiment de Cambrésis (formed in 1776)
 Régiment de Guyenne
 Régiment de Viennois (formed in 1776)
 Régiment Royal
 Régiment de Brie (formed in 1775)
 Régiment de Poitou
 Régiment de Bresse (formed in 1775)
 Régiment de Lyonnais
 Régiment de Maine (formed in 1775)
 Régiment du Dauphin
 Régiment de Perche (formed in 1775)
 Régiment d'Aunis
 Régiment de Bassingby (formed in 1775)
 Régiment de Touraine
 Régiment d'Angoulême
 Régiment d'Aquitaine
 Régiment d'Anjou (formed in 1775)
Régiment de Maréchal de Turenne
 Régiment de Dauphiné
 Régiment de Isle de France
 Régiment de Soissonnais
 Régiment de Limousin
 Régiment Royal Vaisseaux
 Régiment de La Couronne
 Régiment de Bretagne
 Régiment de Lorraine
  Régiment de Vintimille
  Régiment de Hainaut
 Régiment de La Sarre
 Régiment de La Fère
 Régiment Royal Roussillon
 Régiment de Beauvoisis
 Régiment de Rouergne
 Régiment de Bourgogne
 Régiment Royal Marine
 Régiment de Vermandois
 Régiment de Languedoc
 Régiment de Beauce
 Régiment de Médoc
 Régiment de Vivarais
 Régiment de Vexin
 Régiment Royal Comtois
 Régiment de Beaujolais
 Régiment de Boulonnais
 Régiment de Angoumois
 Régiment de Saintonge
 Régiment de Foix
  Régiment de Rohan
 Régiment de Barrois

Princes' Regiments 
The Princes Regiments or Régiments du Princes were those regiments which were either raised or funded almost entirely by a Prince or member of the aristocracy.  The only difference between these regiments and the French infantry were, as stated above their funding, and their exclusion from the regimental uniform grouping.

 Régiment de Le Roi (4 Battalions)
 Régiment de La Reine
 Régiment d'Orléans
 Régiment d'Artois
 Régiment de Condé
 Régiment de Bourbon
 Régiment de Monsieur
 Régiment de Penthièvre
 Régiment de Conti
 Régiment de Chartres
 Régiment d'Enghien

German Infantry 

 Régiment de Alsace (Alsace is a French region, but predominantly German speaking and therefore considered a German unit)
  Régiment de Salm Salm (from the Palatine Zweibrücken)
  Régiment de La Mark (from County of Mark)
  Régiment Royal Suèdois (termed German, but soldiers came from the Kingdom of Sweden)
  Régiment Royal Bavière (from Electorate of Bavaria)
  Régiment de Nassau (from the County of Nassau-Usingen)
  Régiment de Bouillon (from Duchy of Bouillon)
  Régiment de Royal Deux Ponts (from the Palatine Zweibrücken)
  Régiment Royal Liégeois (termed German, but in fact came from the Prince-Bishopric of Liège)

Swiss Infantry 

  Régiment d'Ernst
  Régiment de Salis Samade
  Régiment de Sonnemberg
  Régiment de Castellas
  Régiment de Vigier
  Régiment de Châteauvieux
  Régiment de Diesbach
  Régiment de Courten
  Régiment de Salis Marschlins
  Régiment de Steiner
  Régiment d'Eptingen

Irish Infantry 

  Régiment de Dillon
  Régiment de Berwick
  Régiment de Walsh

Italian Infantry 

  Régiment Royal Italien
  Régiment de Savoie (formed in 1775)

Legions 
Under the 1776 ordinance, all legions were disbanded and contributed a new mounted chasseurs company into each regiment of the cavalry, while the infantry components were absorbed into the new infantry garrison battalions.  Before 1776 these legions composed of a company of grenadiers, eight companies of fusiliers, and eight companies of dragoons, after the Peace of Versailles the volunteers were reduced to:

Legions (mixed infantry and cavalry)

  Légion de Conflans – Disbanded, then reformed in 1778 as the Régiment de Conflans Hussards
 Légion Royale – Disbanded, then reformed in 1778 as the 1er Chasseurs à Cheval
  Légion de Flanders
 Légion de Lorraine
 Légion de Condé
 Légion de Soubise
 Légion de Dauphiné

Following the 1776 ordinance, all of the legions' infantry companies converted to infantry chasseurs and were incorporated into every regiment of the army, thereby providing every infantry regiment with a left–wing chasseur company.  The cavalry of the legions were themselves also converted to chasseurs, but mounted and dispersed throughout the cavalry, thereby providing every cavalry regiment with a mounted (scouts) squadron.

After the former legions were disbanded, three more were raised (8 were originally planned) from foreign volunteers for service during the Anglo–French War (American Revolutionary War), these included:

 1er Legion Voluntaires Étrangers de la Marine (la Royal Marine) – Raised for service in the Caribbean, also sent a detachment with the 2nd Legion to Yorktown
  2éme Legion Voluntaires Étrangers de la Marine (Lauzun's) – Raised for service in the Americas, also served in the West Indies
 3éme Legion Voluntaires Étrangers de la Marine – Raised for service in India and the Second Anglo–Mysore War (most personnel transferred from the Légion Royale)

Provincial Troops 
Under the 1776 ordinance, the provincial volunteers were due to be disbanded, but by order of the King this was reduced.  The provincial troops were divided into 4 categories: Royal Grenadiers, Infantry, État Major Regiments, and provincial artillery.

État Major 

 1er Régiment d'État Major (from battalions of Troyes and Chaumont)
 2éme Régiment d'État Major (from battalions of Moulins and Montluçon)
 3éme Régiment d'État Major (from battalions of Lille and Valenciennes)
 4éme Régiment d'État Major (from battalions of Montbrison and Tarare)
 5éme Régiment d'État Major (from battalions of Privas and Anduze)

Grenadiers 
By ordinance of 30 January 1778, the Corps des Grenaiders Royaux was re–constituted, but were formed as a result of the 1776 ordinance, therefore are presented on this page for convenience.  These new regiments were formed by grouped the old garrison battalions' grenadiers companies from regiments of a certain area.  The regiments consisted of:

 Régiment des Grenadiers Royaux de la Picardie in Lille, companies from the Régiments de Picardie, Cambrésis, Hainaut, Vermandois, Flandre, Artois, and two companies of the 3éme Régiment de État Major
 Régiment des Grenadiers Royaux de la Champagne in Valenciennes, companies from the Régiments de Brie, Orléans, Neustrie, and La Marine, two companies of the Régiment Provincial d'Artillerie de La Fère, and two companies of the 1er Régiment d'État Major
 Régiment des Grenadiers Royaux de la Normandie in Rouen, companies from the Régiments de Perche, Beauce, Vexin, Normandie, Boulonnais, Dauphin, La Couronne, and Penthièvre
 Régiment des Grenadiers Royaux de la Guyenne in Blaye, companies from the Régiments de Guyenne, Aquitaine, Médoc, Forèz, Bresse, Armagnac, Agénois, and Aunis
 Régiment des Grenadiers Royaux du Lyonnais in Vienne, companies from the Régiments de Auvergne and La Sarre, one company from the Provincial Artillery Regiment of Auxonne and from Artillery Regiment of Grenoble, and 2nd and 4th État Major regiments
 Régiment des Grenadiers Royaux de la Touraine in Saumur, companies from the Régiments de Bourbonnais, Limousin, Touraine, La Reine, Conti, Maine, Anjou, and Rohan
 Régiment des Grenadiers Royaux de l'Île de France in Mantes la Jolie, companies from the Régiments d'Isle de France, Beauvoisis, Royal, Bourgogne, Chartres, and Soissonnais
 Régiment des Grenadiers Royaux de l'Orléanais in Orléans, companies from the Régiments de Blésois, Maréchal de Turrene, Auxerrois, Gâtinais, Bassigny, Bassigny, Berry, Poitou, and Angoumois
 Régiment des Grenadiers Royaux de la Bretagne in Rennes, companies from the Régiments de Bretagne, Monsieur, Royal Vaisseaux, Royal Marine, Savoie Carignan, La Fère, Saintonge, and Foix
 Régiment des Grenadiers Royaux de la Lorrainen in Nancy, companies from the Régiments d'Austrasie, Lorraine, Champagne, and Barrois, and the provincial artillery regiments of Strasbourg and Metz
 Régiment des Grenadiers Royaux du Languedoc in Montpellier, companies from the Régiments de Piémont, Royal Roussillon, Languedoc, Provence, and Dauphiné, and the 5th État Major Regiment and Provincial Artillery Regiment of Grenoble
 Régiment des Grenadiers Royaux du Comte de Bourgogne in Besançon, companies from the Régiments de Condé, Royal Comtois, and Enghien, also the Provincial Artillery Regiments of Besançon and Toul, and a company of the Provincial Artillery Regiment of Auxonne
 Régiment des Grenadiers Royaux du Quercy in Montauban, companies from the Régiments de Viennois, Vivarais, Rouergue, Beaujolais, Lyonnais, Bourbon, Navarre, and Béarn

Infantry 
With the exception of the Régiment de la Ville de Paris, all provincial battalions were assigned to an infantry regiment, becoming their "3rd or Garrison Battalion", except for the Régiment du Roi which had their provincial unit as the 5th and 6th battalions respectively.

 Régiment de la Ville de Paris (from the two battalions of Paris)
 Bataillon d'Amiens (attached to Régiment de Picardie)
 1er Bataillon d'Aix (attached to Régiment de Provence)
 Bataillon de Blois (attached to Régiment de Provence)
 Bataillon d'Auch (attached to Régiment de Navarre)
 Bataillon de Marmande (attached to Régiment d'Armagnac)
 Bataillon de Bar le Duc (attached to Régiment de Champagne)
 Bataillon de Nancy (attached to Régiment d'Austrasie)
 Bataillon de Rouen (attached to Régiment de Normandie)
 Bataillon de Pont Audemer (attached to Régiment de Neustrie)
 Bataillon de Neuchâtel (attached to Régiment de La Marine)
 Bataillon de Chartres (attached to Régiment d'Auxerrois)
 Bataillon de Limoges (attached to Régiment de Bourbonnais)
 Bataillon de Périgueux (attached to Régiment de Forèz)
 Bataillon de Saint Gaudens (attached to Régiment de Béarn)
 Bataillon de Libourne (attached to Régiment d'Agenois)
 Bataillon de Clermont (attached to Régiment d'Auvergne)
 Bataillon de Montargis (attached to Régiment de Gâtinais)
 1er Bataillon d'Arras (attached to Régiment de Flandre)
 Bataillon de Péronne (attached to Régiment de Cambrésis)
 Bataillon de Nérac (attached to Régiment de Guyenne)
 Bataillon d'Albi (attached to Régiment de Viennois)
 Bataillon de Senlis (attached to Régiment du Roi)
 Bataillon de Mantes (attached to Régiment du Roi)
 Bataillon de Joigny (attached to Régiment Royal)
 Bataillon de Laon (attached to Régiment de Brie)
 Bataillon de Poitiers (attached to Régiment de Poitou)
 Bataillon de Bergerac (attached to Régiment de Bresse)
 Bataillon de Rodèz (attached to Régiment de Lyonnais)
 Bataillon du Mans (attached to Régiment de Maine)
 Bataillon de Caen (attached to Régiment du Dauphin)
 Bataillon d'Alençon (attached to Régiment de Perche)
 Bataillon de Saint Jean d'Angély (attached to Régiment d'Aunis)
 Bataillon de Bourges (attached to Régiment de Bassigny)
 Bataillon de Tours (attached to Régiment de Touraine)
 Bataillon de Vannes (attached to Régiment de Savoie Carignan)
 Bataillon de Villeneuve d'Agen (attached to Régiment de Aquitaine)
 Bataillon de Mayenne (attached to Régiment d'Anjou)
 Bataillon d'Orléans (attached to Régiment de Maréchal de Turenne)
 2éme Bataillon d'Aix (attached to Régiment de Dauphiné)
 Bataillon de Saint Denis (attached to Régiment de Isle de France)
 Bataillon de Soissons (attached to Régiment de Soissons)
 Bataillon de Saumur (attached to Régiment de La Reine)
 Bataillon d'Angoulême (attached to Régiment de Lomousin)
 Bataillon de Nantes (attached to Régiment Royal Vaisseaux)
 Bataillon de Noyon (attached to Régiment de Orléans)
 Bataillon de Saint Lô (attached to Régiment de La Couronne)
 Bataillon de Rennes (attached to Régiment de Bretagne)
 Bataillon de Sarreguemines (attached to Régiment de Lorraine)
 2éme Bataillon d'Arras (attached to Régiment d'Artois)
 Bataillon de Châteauroux (attached to Régiment de Berry)
 Bataillon d'Abbeville (attached to Régiment de Hainaut)
 Bataillon de Brioude (attached to Régiment Royal Roussillon)
 Bataillon de Salins (attached to Régiment de Condé)
 Bataillon de Millau (attached to Régiment de Bourbon)
 Bataillon de Beauvais (attached to Régiment de Beauvoisi)
 Bataillon de Figeac (attached to Régiment de Rouergue)
 Bataillon de Provins (attached to Régiment de Bourgogne)
 Bataillon de Redon (attached to Régiment Royal Marine)
 Bataillon de Gisors (attached to Régiment de Vermandois)
 Bataillon de Carcassonne (attached to Régiment de Languedoc)
 Bataillon de Mortagne (attached to Régiment de Beauce)
 Bataillon de Saint Sever (attached to Régiment de Médoc)
 Bataillon de Castelnaudary (attached to Régiment de Vivarais)
 Bataillon d'Argentan (attached to Régiment de Vexin)
 Bataillon de Dôle (attached to Régiment Royal Comtois)
 Bataillon de Cahors (attached to Régiment de Beaujolais)
 Bataillon de Dinan (attached to Régiment de Monsieur)
 Bataillon de Vire (attached to Régiment de Penthièvre)
 Bataillon de Vernoy (attached to Régiment de Boulonnais)
 Bataillon de Saint Maixent (attached to Régiment d'Angoumois)
 Bataillon d'Angers (attached to Régiment de Conti)
 Bataillon de Fontenay (attached to Régiment de Saintonge)
 Bataillon de Parthenay (attached to Régiment de Foix)
 Bataillon de Falaise (attached to Régiment de Rohan)
 Bataillon de Corbeil (attached to Régiment de Chartres)
 Bataillon d'Étain (attached to Régiment de Barrois)
 Bataillon de Lons le Saunier (attached to Régiment d'Enghien)

Artillery 
New regiments and their predecessor battalions shown in order of precedence.

 Régiment Provincial d'Artillerie de La Fère (from battalions of Châlons and Saint Dizier)
 Régiment Provincial d'Artillerie de Metz (from battalions of Metz and Verdun)
 Régiment Provincial d'Artillerie de Besançon (from battalions of Dijon and Semur en Auxois)
 Régiment Provincial d'Artillerie de Grenoble (from battalions of Velence and Romans)
 Régiment Provincial d'Artillerie de Strasbourg (from battalions of Strasbourg and Colmar)
 Régiment Provincial d'Artillerie d'Auxonne (from battalions of Châlons and Autun)
 Régiment Provincial d'Artillerie de Toul (from battalions of Vesoul and Ornans)

Artillery 
In 1776 the French artillery consisted of 7 regiments, of which all held the number 64 in regimental precedence.

 Régiment de La Fère
 Régiment de Metz
 Régiment de Besançon
 Régiment de Grenoble
 Régiment de Strasbourg
 Régiment d'Auxonne
 Régiment de Toul
 Battalion d'Ingénieures – forms part of the Royal Corps of Artillery

Admiralty 
Until 1890, all colonial affairs were controlled by the Secretary of State of the Navy (known as the Admiralty) (Secrétaire d'État à la Marine), though the below regiments were part of the French Royal Army.  They are only shown under the Admiralty as they were under the operational command of the organisation, not the administrative.

Colonial Regiments 

  Régiment du Cap – Saint Domingue
  Régiment de Port au Prince – Saint Domingue
  Régiment de Martinique – Antilles
  Régiment de Guadeloupe – Antilles
  Régiment d'Île de France – Indian Ocean
  Régiment d'Île de Bourbon – Indian Ocean
  Régiment de Pondichéry – French India

Notes

Footnotes

References 

 Louis Susane, Historie de l'Ancienne Infanterie Français, Volume I, 1849 Naval and Polytechnical Military Library of Paris, Paris, France.
 Louis Susane, Historie de l'Ancienne Infanterie Français, Volume VII, 1853 Naval and Polytechnical Military Library of Paris, Paris, France.
 Louis Susane, History of The French Artillery, Second Edition, 1874 Rue Jacob, Paris, France.
 Digby Smith, Kevin E. Kiley, and Jeremy Black, An Illustrated Encyclopedia of Uniforms of the American War of Independence, 2017 Lorenz Books, London, United Kingdom. .
 Digby Smith & Jeremy Black, An Illustrated Encyclopedia of Uniforms of the Napoleonic Wars, 2015 Lorenz Books, London, United Kingdom. .
 Digby Smith, Napoleon's Regiments: Battle Histories of the Regiments of the French Army, 1792–1815, 2000 Greenhill Books, London, United Kingdom. .

French regiments of the Ancien Régime
Lists of military units and formations of France
Lists of military units and formations